DXVB-TV, channel 21, is a commercial television station of Philippine television network GTV, owned by Citynet Network Marketing and Productions, a subsidiary of GMA Network Inc. Its transmitter is located at Brgy. Cabatangan, Zamboanga City.

Digital television

Digital channels

DXVB-TV's feed is broadcast on DXLA-TV digital subchannel operates on UHF channel 41 (635.143 MHz) and broadcasts on the following subchannels:

GTV 21 Zamboanga on Cable

See also
GMA Network
GTV
DXLA-TV
List of GTV stations

References

GTV (Philippine TV network) stations
Television stations in Zamboanga City